Hall is a surname of Scottish and Irish origin. The surname is of Celtic descent, spreading throughout the Celtic nations of Scotland and Ireland in early times, then spreading to the Anglo-Saxon nation of England where it has become more prominent. The surname is found in many mediaeval manuscripts throughout these countries 

In recent history, the Halls (Clan Hall) were one of the sixty major riding families of the Scottish Marches and were involved reiving as other border clans were. As with all Reiving families, they would consider themselves loyal to neither the English or the Scots, the family name holding allegiance over all else. See Border Reivers.

In England the surname of Hall originates in 1090 AD when Lincolnshire nobleman Arthur FitzWilliam changed his name to Arthur Hall to distinguish himself from his older brother of the same name.

Notable people with the surname "Hall" include

A
Aaron Hall (disambiguation), multiple people
Adam Hall (born 1980), American ice hockey player
Adelaide Hall (1901–1993), American-born singer
Adrian Hall (disambiguation), multiple people
Ahmard Hall (born 1979), American football player
Ainsley Hall (born 1972), Caymanian cricketer
Al Hall (disambiguation), multiple people
Alaina Reed Hall (1946–2009), American actress
Alan Hall (1952–2015), British cell biologist and biology professor
Albert Hall (disambiguation), multiple people
Aleksander Hall (born 1953), Polish politician
Alex Hall (disambiguation), multiple people
Alexander Hall (disambiguation), multiple people
Alexis Hall (disambiguation), multiple people
Alf Hall (1896–1964), South African cricketer
Alfred Hall (disambiguation), multiple people
Alicia Hall (born 1985), American fashion model
Allan Hall (disambiguation), multiple people (including Alan Hall & Allen Hall)
Almer Hall (1912–1994), English footballer
Alvin Hall (disambiguation), multiple people
Amy Hall, English actress
Andre Hall (born 1982), American football player
Andrea Hall (born 1947), American actress
Andrew Hall (disambiguation), multiple people
Andy Hall (American football) (born 1980), American football player
Angeline Stickney Hall (1830–1892), American academic
Anna Hall (disambiguation), multiple people
Ansel Franklin Hall (1894–1962), American naturalist
Anthony Hall (disambiguation), multiple people
A. Oakey Hall (1826–1898), American politician
Arch Hall (disambiguation), multiple people
Arsenio Hall (born 1955), American journalist
Arthur Hall (disambiguation), multiple people
Asa Hall (born 1986), English footballer
Asaph Hall (1829–1907), American astronomer
Asaph Hall Jr. (1859–1939), American astronomer
Ashley Hall (disambiguation), multiple people
Augusta Hall (1802–1896), Welsh philanthropist
Augustus Hall (1814–1861), American politician
Austin Hall (disambiguation), multiple people

B
Bambi Hall (born 1992), Canadian wrestler
Barbara Hall (disambiguation), multiple people
Barrie Lee Hall Jr. (1949–2011), American trumpeter
Barry Hall (born 1977), Australian footballer
Barry Hall (diplomat) (1921–2013), Australian diplomat
Basil Hall (1788–1844), British sailor
Ben Hall (disambiguation), multiple people
Benoni Hall (1710–1779), American judge
Benjamin Hall (disambiguation), multiple people
Benton Jay Hall (1835–1894), American politician
Bernard Hall (disambiguation), multiple people
Bert Hall (disambiguation), multiple people
Beryl Patricia Hall (1917–2010), British ornithologist
Betty Hall (1921–2018), American politician
Bill Hall (disambiguation), multiple people
Bob Hall (disambiguation), multiple people
Bolling Hall (1767–1836), American politician
Brad Hall (born 1958), American actor
Brandon Hall (disambiguation), multiple people
Breece Hall (born 2001), American football player
Brent Hall (born 1986), Australian footballer
Brian Hall (disambiguation), multiple people
Bridget Hall (born 1977), American model
Bruce Hall (disambiguation), multiple people
Bryce Hall (born 1999), American social media personality
Bryce Hall (American football) (born 1997), American football player
Buddy Hall (born 1945), American pool player
Bug Hall (born 1985), American actor

C
Calvin S. Hall (1909–1985), American psychologist
Cameron Hall (disambiguation), multiple people
Camilla Hall (1945–1974), American activist
Carl Hall (disambiguation), multiple people
Carlos Hall (born 1979), American football player
Carlotta Case Hall (1880–1949), American botanist
Carol Hall, (1936–2018), American composer
Carol K. Hall, American chemical engineer
Caroline A. Hall (1838–1918), American activist
Catherine Hall (born 1946), British historian
Cecelia Hall, American sound editor
Chapin Hall (1816–1879), American politician
Charles Hall (disambiguation), multiple people
Charley Hall (disambiguation), multiple people
Charlie Hall (disambiguation), multiple people
Cheryl Hall (born 1950), British actress
Chester Moore Hall (1703–1771), British astronomer
Chris Hall (disambiguation), multiple people
Christian Hall (2001–2020), Asian-American man killed by police
Christopher Hall (disambiguation), multiple people
Clarrie Hall (1890–1976), Australian footballer
Clifton A. Hall (1826–1913), American architect
Cody Hall (born 1991), American wrestler
Coombe Hall (1871–1932), Scottish footballer
Connie Hall (1929–2021), American musician
Conrad Hall (1926–2003), American cinematographer
Conrad W. Hall (born 1958), American cinematographer
Cory Hall (American football) (born 1976), American football player
Courtney Hall (1968–2021), American football player
Craig Hall (disambiguation), multiple people
Cynthia Hall (disambiguation), multiple people

D
Daeshon Hall (born 1995), American football player
Dahéli Hall (born 1976), American actress
Dale Hall (1924–1996), American football coach
Dana Hall (born 1969), American football player
Daniel Hall (disambiguation), multiple people
Danniebelle Hall (1938–2000), American musician
Dante Hall (born 1978), American football player
Darick Hall (born 1995), American baseball player
Darnell Hall (born 1971), American athlete
Darren Hall (disambiguation), multiple people
Daryl Hall (born 1949), American musician
Darwin Hall (1844–1919), American politician
David Hall (disambiguation), multiple people
Deakin Hall (disambiguation), multiple people
Dean Hall (disambiguation), multiple people
DeAngelo Hall (born 1983), American football player
Deidre Hall (born 1947), American actress
Del Hall (born 1949), Canadian ice hockey player
Delores Hall, American actress
Delton Hall (born 1965), American football player
Dennis Hall (born 1971), American wrestler
Derek Hall (disambiguation), multiple people
Derick Hall (born 2001), American football player
Derrick Hall (born 1969), American executive
Derrick Hall (cricketer) (1892–1947), Irish cricketer
D. G. E. Hall (1892–1979), British historian
Dick Hall (disambiguation), multiple people
D. J. Hall (born 1986), American football player
DL Hall (born 1998), American baseball player
Dolly Hall (born 1960), American film producer
Donald Hall (disambiguation), multiple people
Donta Hall (born 1997), American basketball player
Douglas Hall (disambiguation), multiple people
Drew Hall (born 1963), American baseball player
Duncan Hall (1925–2011), Australian rugby league footballer
Durward Gorham Hall (1910–2001), American politician

E
Earle B. Hall (1919–1941), American naval officer
Edd Hall (born 1958), American television announcer
Eddie Hall (born 1988), British strongman
Edith Hall (born 1959), British academic
Edmond Hall (1901–1967), American musician
Edward Hall (disambiguation), multiple people
Edwin Hall (disambiguation), multiple people
Eldon C. Hall, American computer specialist
Eleanor Hall, Australian journalist
Eleanor L. Hall (born 1947), American psychologist
Elijah Hall (1742–1830), American naval officer
Elise Hall (musician) (1853–1924), American saxophonist
Elise Hall (born 1989), American politician
Eliza Hall (1847–1916), Australian philanthropist
Elizabeth Hall (disambiguation), multiple people
Ella Hall (1896–1982), American actress
Ellen Hall (1922–1999), American actress
Ellis Hall (1889–1949), English footballer
Emanuel Hall (born 1997), American football player
Emily Hall (born 1978), American musician
Emmett Matthew Hall (1898–1995), Canadian judge
Erasmus D. Hall (??–1878), American politician
Eric Hall (disambiguation), multiple people
Ernest Hall (disambiguation), multiple people
Ervin Hall (born 1947), American athlete
Esther Hall (born 1973), British actress
Ethel Hall (1898–1927), American actress
Eugene Raymond Hall (1902–1986), American zoologist
Eula Hall (1927–2021), American health activist
Evelyn Beatrice Hall (1868–1956), British author
Evelyne Hall (1909–1993), American athlete

F
Fawn Hall (born 1959), American secretary
Fergus Hall (born 1947), Scottish artist
Fiona Hall (disambiguation), multiple people
Fitz Hall (born 1980), English footballer
Fitzedward Hall (1825–1901), American orientalist
Floyd Hall (born 1938), American businessman
Forrest M. Hall (1869–1961), American football coach
Frances Elliott Mann Hall (1853–1935), American teacher
Francis Hall (disambiguation), multiple people
Frank Hall (disambiguation), multiple people
Frederick Hall (disambiguation), multiple people

G
Gabriella Hall (born 1966), American actress
Galen Hall (born 1940), American football coach
Gareth Hall (born 1969), Welsh footballer
Gary Hall (disambiguation), multiple people
Gene Hall (1913–1993), American professor
George Hall (disambiguation), multiple people
Geri Hall (born 1972), Canadian actress and comedian
Gita Hall (1933–2016), Swedish-American actress
Glen Hall (disambiguation), multiple people
Glenvil Hall (1887–1962), British politician
Gordon Hall (disambiguation), multiple people
GP Hall (born 1943), English musician
Granger Hall (basketball) (born 1962), American basketball player
Grayson Hall (1922–1985), American actress
Greg Hall (disambiguation), multiple people
Granville Stanley Hall (1844–1924), American psychologist
Gus Hall (1910–2000), American politician
Guthrie Hall (born 1984), South African rugby union footballer

H
Halsey Hall (1898–1977), American sportswriter
Hanna R. Hall (born 1984), American actress
Harold Hall (disambiguation), multiple people
Harriet A. Hall (1945–2023), American physician
Harry Hall (disambiguation), multiple people
Harvey Hall (1941–2018), American businessman and politician
Harvey Hall (actor) (1931–1997), English actor
Henry Hall (disambiguation), multiple people
Herbert Hall (disambiguation), multiple people
Hiland Hall (1795–1885), American politician
Homer W. Hall (1870–1954), American politician
Howard Hall (disambiguation), multiple people
Huntz Hall (1919–1999), American actor

I
Ian Hall (born 1939), English cricketer
Ian Hall (musician) (1940–2022), Guyanese musician
Ilan Hall (born 1982), American chef
Ira Hall (1892–1987), American race car driver
Irma P. Hall (born 1935), American actress
Irv Hall (1918–2006), American baseball player
Isaac Hollister Hall (1837–1896), American orientalist

J
Jack Hall (disambiguation), multiple people
Jacob Hall (fl. 1668), English rope-dancer
Jacob Hall (pirate) (fl. 1663), English pirate
Jalyn Hall (born 2006), American actor
James Hall (disambiguation), multiple people
Jane Hall (disambiguation), multiple people
Janet C. Hall (born 1948), American judge
Jaren Hall (born 1998), American football player
Jason Hall (disambiguation), multiple people
J. C. Hall (disambiguation), several people
Jeff Hall (disambiguation), multiple people
Jennifer Hall (born 1977), American actress
Jennifer Caron Hall (born 1958), English actress
Jenny Waelder Hall (1898–1989), Austrian-born psychiatrist
Jeremiah Hall (born 1998), American football player
Jeremy Hall (disambiguation), multiple people
Jermaine Hall (born 1980), American basketball player
Jerome Hall (1901–1992), American academic
Jerry Hall (born 1956), British-American model
Jesse Lee Hall (1849–1911), Texas Ranger
Jessica Hall (disambiguation), multiple people
Jill Hall (born 1949), Australian politician
Jillian Hall (born 1980), American wrestler
Jim Hall (disambiguation), multiple people
Jimmie Hall (born 1938), American baseball player
Jimmy Hall (born 1949), lead singer of Wet Willie
 Jimmy Hall (basketball) (born 1994), American basketball player in the Israeli National League
Jo Hall, Australian television presenter for the Nine Network
Joan Hall (born 1946), Australian politician
Joan Hall (UK politician) (born 1935), British politician
Joe Hall (disambiguation), multiple people
John Hall (disambiguation), multiple people
Jon Hall (disambiguation), multiple people
Jordan Hall (disambiguation), multiple people
Joseph Hall (disambiguation), multiple people
Josh Hall (disambiguation), multiple people
Joshua Hall (disambiguation), multiple people
Joyce Hall (1891–1982), American businessman
J. Storrs Hall, American scientist
Juanita Hall (1901–1968), American actress
Judith Goslin Hall (born 1939), Canadian-American physician
Judson Hall (1855–1938), American politician
Julia R. Hall (1865–1918), American physician
Julian Hall (1837–1911), British army officer
Justin Hall (born 1974), American journalist

K
Karen Hall (born 1956), American screenwriter
Katarzyna Hall (born 1957), Polish educator
Kate Hall (disambiguation), multiple people
Katie Hall (disambiguation), multiple people
Kaye Hall (born 1951), American swimmer
Keith Hall (disambiguation), multiple people
Kelly Hall (disambiguation), multiple people
Kemon Hall (born 1997), American football player
Kenneth Hall (disambiguation), multiple people
Kermit L. Hall (1944–2006), American educator
Kevin Hall (disambiguation), multiple people
Kira Hall, American anthropologist
Kim F. Hall (born 1961), English professor
Korey Hall (born 1983), American football player
Kristen Hall (born 1962), American musician
Kwanza Hall (born 1971), American Representative
Kyle Hall (born 1990), American businessman and politician

L
Lani Hall (born 1945), American singer
Larry Hall (1940–1997), American musician
Larry Hall (North Carolina politician) (born 1955), American politician
Lars Hall (1927–1991), Swedish athlete
Lars Hall (art director) (1938–2018), Swedish art director
Laura Hall (disambiguation), multiple people
Lawrence Hall (disambiguation), multiple people
Lee Hall (disambiguation), multiple people
Lemanski Hall (born 1970), American football player
Lena Hall (born 1980), American actress
Lene Hall, Barbadian model
Leola Hall (1881–1930), American architect
Leon Hall (born 1984), American football player
Leonard Hall (disambiguation), multiple people
Les Hall, American musician
Leslie Hall (born 1981), American musician
Lewis Hall (1895–1943), American soldier
Lewis Hall (born 2004), English footballer

Lincoln Hall (climber) (1956–2012), Australian mountaineer
Lindsay Bernard Hall (1859–1935), Australian artist
Lisa Hall (born 1967), English golfer
Lisa Hall (musician), British singer
Livingston Hall (1903–1995), American professor
Lloyd Hall (1894–1971), American chemist
Logan Hall (born 2000), American football player
Lois Hall (1926–2006), American actress
Louis Hall (1852–1915), English cricketer
Louisa Hall (born 1982), American squash player 
Louisa Jane Hall (1802–1892), American writer and literary critic
Lucy M. Hall (1843–1907), American physician
Luther E. Hall (1869–1921), American politician
Lyall Hall (1861–1935), Australian politician
Lyman Hall (1724–1790), American politician
Lyman Hall (academic) (1859–1905), American academic
Lynden David Hall (1974–2006), British musician

M
Maddison Hall (born 1964), Australian murderer
Maggie Hall (1853–1888), Irish-born prostitute
Malcolm Hall (fashion designer) (born 1947), British fashion designer
Manly Palmer Hall (1901–1990), Canadian author
Marc Hall (born 1985), Canadian activist
Marcellus Hall, American artist
Marcus Hall (born 1976), English footballer
Margaret Hall (disambiguation), multiple people
Marguerite Higgins Hall (1920–1966), American war correspondent
Marie Hall (1884–1956), English violinist
Mark Hall (disambiguation), multiple people
Marshall Hall (disambiguation), multiple people
Martin Hall (disambiguation), multiple people
Marvin Hall (born 1993), American football player
Mary Hall (disambiguation), multiple people
Max Hall (born 1985), American football player
Máximo Soto Hall (1871–1944), Guatemalan novelist
Maxwell Hall, British colonial administrator
Matthew Hall (disambiguation), multiple people
Megan Hall (born 1974), South African triathlete
Mel Hall (born 1960), American baseball player
Melanie Hall, UK murder victim who was found next to a highway
Melanie Hall (basketball), Australian athlete
Melvin Hall (1915–2001), American unicyclist
Meredith Hall (born 1949), American writer
Michael Hall (disambiguation), multiple people
Millard Hall (1926–2005), American journalist
Mindy Hall, makeup artist
Minor Hall (1897–1959), American drummer
Monty Hall (1921–2017), Canadian-American game show host
Mordaunt Hall (1878–1973), American film critic
Murray Hall (disambiguation), multiple people

N
Naomi Hall, American musician
Natalie Hall (born 1990), Canadian actress and singer
Nate Hall (born 1996), American football player
Nathan Hall (disambiguation), multiple people
Nellie Hall (1895–1976), British suffragette
Newton Hall (disambiguation), multiple people
Nicholas Hall, Australian jockey
Nick Hall (disambiguation), multiple people
Nickie Hall (born 1959), American football player
Norm Hall (1926–1992), American race car driver
Norma Bassett Hall (1889–1957), American printmaker
Norman Hall (disambiguation), multiple people

O
Oakley Hall (1920–2008), American novelist
O. B. Grayson Hall Jr. (born 1958), American banking executive
Obed Hall (1757–1828), American politician
Oliver Hall (1852–1946), American politician
Osee M. Hall (1847–1914), American politician
Owen Hall (1853–1907), British librettist

P
Parker Hall (disambiguation), multiple people
Patricia Hall (disambiguation), multiple people
Patrick Hall (disambiguation), multiple people
Paul Hall (disambiguation), multiple people
Peirson M. Hall (1894–1979), American politician
Peter Hall (disambiguation), multiple people
Phil Hall (disambiguation), multiple people
Philo Hall (1865–1938), American politician
P. J. Hall (born 1995), American football player
Pooch Hall (born 1976), American actor
Porter Hall (1888–1953), American actor
Prince Hall (1735–1807), American freemason

R
Radclyffe Hall (1880–1943), British author
Ralph Hall (1923–2019), American politician
Rannell Hall (born 1993), American football player
Ray Hall (born 1980), Australian footballer
Rebecca Hall (born 1982), English actress
Rebecca Hall (musician) (born 1965), American musician
Regina Hall (born 1970), American actress
René Hall (1912–1988), American musician
Rhett Hall (born 1968), American football player
Richard Hall (disambiguation), multiple people
Rob Hall (1961–1996), New Zealand mountain climber
Robert Hall (disambiguation), multiple people
Robin Hall (1936–1998), Scottish musician
Rod Hall (literary agent) (1951–2004), British literary agent
Rod Hall (racer) (1937–2019), American racing driver
Roderick Stephen Hall (1915–1945), American OSS agent
Rodney Hall (disambiguation), multiple people
Roger Hall (disambiguation), multiple people
Ron Hall (disambiguation), multiple people
Ronald Hall (1895–1975), British missionary
Ronald Acott Hall (1892–1966), British diplomat
Rosalind Hall, Welsh choral director
Rosalys Hall (1914–2006), American author
Rosetta Sherwood Hall (1865–1951), Canadian missionary
Roy Hall (disambiguation), multiple people
Ryan Hall (disambiguation), multiple people

S
Sam Hall (disambiguation), multiple people
Samantha Hall (born 1982), Australian environmentalist
Samuel Hall (disambiguation), multiple people
Sandra Hall (born 1951), American blues and soul blues singer and songwriter
Sara Hall (born 1983), American distance runner
Sarah Hall (disambiguation), multiple people
Scott Hall (disambiguation), multiple people
Sean Hall (born 1967), American rower
Sean Hall (curler), Australian curler
Shadrach A. Hall (1835-1915), American farmer and politician
Shane Hall (born 1969), American NASCAR driver
Shannon Hall (born 1970), American boxer
Sharlot Hall (1870–1943), American journalist
Sheldon Hall (film historian) (born 1964), British film historian
Simon Hall (disambiguation), multiple people
Skip Hall (born 1944), American football coach
Skip Hall (martial artist) (born 1948), American martial artist
Skip Hall (musician) (1909–1980), American musician
Spencer Hall (1805–1875), English librarian
Spencer Timothy Hall (1812–1885), English writer and mesmerist
Steele Hall (Australian politician) (born 1928), Australian politician
Steve Hall (disambiguation), multiple people
Stewart Hall (football coach) (born 1959), English football coach
Stuart Hall (disambiguation), multiple people
Susanna Hall (1583–1648), English daughter of William Shakespeare
Suzan Hall, Canadian politician
Suzanne Hall (born 1972), English actress
Suzanne David Hall (1927–2011), French spy
Syd Hall (disambiguation), multiple people
Sydney Hall (disambiguation), multiple people

T
Tally Hall (soccer) (born 1985), American soccer player
Tamron Hall (born 1970), American journalist
Tanner Hall (disambiguation), multiple people
Tarquin Hall (born 1969), British writer
Taylor Hall (disambiguation), multiple people
Ted Hall (disambiguation), multiple people
Terez Hall (born 1996), American football player
Terrie Hall (1960–2013), American anti-smoking activist
Terry Hall (disambiguation), multiple people
Tex G. Hall (born 1956), former Native American tribal chairman
Theodore Hall (1925–1999), American physicist and Soviet spy
Thomas Hall (disambiguation), multiple people
Thurston Hall (1882–1958), American actor
Tiffiny Hall (born 1984), Australian author and TV presenter
Tim Hall (disambiguation), multiple people
Timothy Hall (born 1944), English cricketer
Timothy Hall (bishop) (1637–1690), English bishop
Toby Hall (born 1975), American baseball player
Tom Hall (disambiguation), multiple people
Tommy Hall (disambiguation), multiple people
Tony Hall (disambiguation), multiple people
Tracey Hall, American basketball player
Tracy Hall (1919–2008), American inventor
Travis Hall (born 1972), American football player
Trevor Hall (disambiguation), multiple people
Tubby Hall (1895–1945), American musician
Tyler Hall (disambiguation), multiple people

U
Uriel Sebree Hall (1852–1932), American politician

V
Valerie Hall (1946–2016), British paleoecologist
Vera Hall (1902–1964), American singer
Victoria Hall (disambiguation), multiple people
Vince Hall (born 1984), American football player
Virginia Hall (1906–1982), American spy

W
Walter Hall (disambiguation), multiple people
Warren D. C. Hall (1788–1867), American politician
Wayne Hall (disambiguation), multiple people
Wendell Hall (1896–1969), American musician
Wendy Hall (born 1952), British academic
Wes Hall (born 1937), former West Indian cricketer
Wilbur Hall (musician) (1894–1983), American musician
Willard Hall (1780–1875), American politician 
Willard Preble Hall (1820–1882), American politician
William Hall (disambiguation), multiple people
Willie Hall (disambiguation), multiple people
Willis Hall (New York politician) (1801–1868), American politician
Willis Hall (1929–2005), English playwright
Wilton E. Hall (1901–1980), American politician
Windlan Hall (born 1950), American football player
Winslow Hall (rower) (1912–1995), American rower
Winter Hall (1872–1947), New Zealand actor

Z
Zachariah Adam Hall (1865–1952), Canadian politician

Given name
Hall Overton (1920–1972), American composer

References

English-language surnames
Surnames of English origin
Scottish surnames